The  2010 Iowa Corn Indy 250 was the fourth running of the Iowa Corn Indy 250 and the eighth round of the 2010 IndyCar Series season. It took place on Sunday, June 20, 2010. The race was contested over 250 laps at the  Iowa Speedway in Newton, Iowa, and was telecasted by Versus in the United States.

The winner of the 2010 Iowa Corn Indy 250 was Tony Kanaan.  Will Power held the pole position running a time of 1:10.9925 seconds, while Dario Franchitti had the fastest lap running lap 21 in 17.9696 seconds.  Hélio Castroneves finished in second, while E. J. Viso came in third place.


Classification

Qualifying

Race

Championship standings after the race

Drivers' Championship standings

 Note: Only the top five positions are included.

Iowa Corn Indy 250
Iowa Corn Indy 250
Iowa Corn Indy 250